"White Treble, Black Bass" is a song by Australian house and electronic music DJ producer, Sgt Slick. The song was released in 1998 as his debut single. The single peaked at number 69 in Australia.

At the ARIA Music Awards of 1998, the song won ARIA Award for Best Dance Release.

In 2015, the song was listed at number 42 in In the Mix's 100 Greatest Australian Dance Tracks of All Time with Katie Cunningham saying the ARIA Awards "got it right" with this song winning an award in 1998, calling the song an "undisputed classic". 

John Course of Vicious Grooves said this song was the label's third ever release, but remains one of the label's milestone tracks. Course said "We loved the groove and signed the track, but it had a sample which we had to clear. Ironically the spoken words it samples saying 'White people turn up the treble, black people turn up the bass' was from a music documentary and ended up being the voice of a prominent music business lawyer. The lawyer was amused that he had worked in the business for years and it was the first time he ever appeared on a record, so he was happy to clear the vocal."

Track listings

Charts

Release history

References

 
1998 singles
1998 songs
ARIA Award-winning songs